Majid Samii (Romanization of Persian: Majid Samiêi), (born 19 June 1937) is an Iranian neurosurgeon and medical scientist.

Biography

Samii was born in Tehran, Iran on 19 June 1937. After having completed his high school education in Iran, he moved to Germany, where he started his medical studies at the University of Mainz.

He has been the president of the International Society for Neurosurgery and was elected as the founding president of MASCIN – "Madjid Samii Congress of International Neurosurgeons" in 2003.

Samii received the "Physician" award by the north German city of Hanover. Former German chancellor Gerhard Schröder hailed the 70-year-old Samii for his medical contribution to neuroscience as head of the International Neuroscience Institute (INI), based in Hanover.

He is the president of the International Neuroscience Institute (INI).

In 2007, he received the "Friendship Award", from the Prime minister of China for his contribution to the medical progress of the country.

He had earlier received the 2014 Leibniz Ring Prize in Berlin.

In 2011, World Federation of Neurosurgical Societies coined a medal of honor bearing Samii's name which would be given to outstanding neurosurgeons every two years. The first awardee of this medal was Prof. Maurice Choux from France.

Present duties

 President of the International Neuroscience Institute (INI) at Otto von Guericke University President of the China INI at Capital University in Beijing
 President of the Neurobionic Foundation
 President of the Board of Trustees of AWD Children's Assistance Foundation
 Director emeritus of the Neurosurgical Clinic, Nordstadt Hospital in Hannover
 Honorary President of the World Federation of Neurosurgical Societies (WFNS)
 Honorary President of the World Federation of Neurosurgical Societies Endowment/Foundation (WFNS)
 Honorary President of the German Society of Skull Base Surgery
 Honorary President of CURAC - German Society of Computer and Robot-Assisted Surgery

Awards

 2001: Honorary President of The World Federation of Neurosurgical Societies
 2005: Carl Zeiss Honorary Lecture and Visiting Professorship initiated and hosted by the Department of Neurosurgery of the Johann Wolfgang Goethe-University, Frankfurt am Main, Germany
 2006: Iranian Science and Culture Hall of Fame
 World Physician 2007
 2008: Friendship Award of the People's Republic of China.
 2010: Neurosurgical Society of America Medal Recipient.
 2013:  Prize winner.
2013: Neurosurgeon of the Year: Elected by the World Neurosurgery journal.
 2014: World top neurosurgeon and Golden Neuron Award Winner.
 2017: Awarded Honorary Doctorate title by Uskudar University for his valuable global researches and clinical contributions in Neuroscience.

Notes

External links
 
 Curriculum Vitae of Majid Samii - up to 1988
 "Samii's Essentials in Neurosurgery"
www.radiozamaneh.com

Johannes Gutenberg University Mainz alumni
Iranian expatriate academics
Iranian surgeons
20th-century Iranian inventors
People from Tehran
Iranian emigrants to Germany
German neurosurgeons
1937 births
Living people
Foreign Members of the Russian Academy of Sciences
Officers Crosses of the Order of Merit of the Federal Republic of Germany
Iranian Science and Culture Hall of Fame recipients in Medicine